Umerali Shihab AlHussainy Pookoya Thangal was an Islamic leader from Kerala, India.

Life

The second son of the eminent Muslim League Leader Pookoya Thangal, Umerali Shihab Thangal was a judge in Wayanad, Kerala. He was the chairman of the Kerala Waqf Board and president of the Sunni Yuvajana Sangham. 

Thangal died of cancer at Malappuram on 3 July 2008, aged 68.

References

Sharia judges
Deaths from cancer in India
2008 deaths
Islam in Kerala
20th-century births
Indian Union Muslim League politicians
People from Wayanad district
Kerala Sunni-Shafi'i scholars